Islamic Iran Solidarity Party (Hezb-e Hambastegi-e Iran-e Eslami) is an Iranian reformist political party founded in 1998, by 10 members of Parliament of Iran. The party is a member of Council for coordinating the Reforms Front and publishes newspaper Hambastegi. Ali Asghar Ahmadi is the General Secretary, an office previously held by Ebrahim Asgharzadeh and Mohamadreza Raahchamani. They have supported Mohammad Khatami in 2001 election, Mehdi Karoubi in 2005 and Mir-Hossein Mousavi in 2009.

The party had some 50 seats in the Iranian Parliament during 2000–2004 and its fraction was headed by Qorban-Ali Qandahari.

Platform 
The party's platform embraces pluralism and freedom of speech while favouring mixed economy. Its agenda is very similar to those of Islamic Iran Participation Front and the only difference between the two parties seems to be over "personal conflicts for leadership".

Party leaders

References 

Reformist political groups in Iran
Political parties established in 1998